Saint Juvenal may refer to:

Juvenal of Benevento (died 132 A.D.)
Juvenal of Narni (d. 369), Bishop of Narni
Juvenal of Jerusalem (d. 458), Bishop of Jerusalem
Giovenale Ancina (d. 1604), beatus
Juvenaly of Alaska (1761-1795), first martyr of the Russian Orthodox church in the Americas